James Stuart Cornes (born 4 March 1960) is a Welsh former footballer who played as a centre-back.

Cornes was born in Usk. He started his career at Hereford United in 1978, making 93 league appearances and scoring 3 league goals between 1978 and 1982. He subsequently joined Cheltenham Town, where he won the Southern Football League Premier Division in the 1984–85 season.

References

1960 births
Living people
Welsh footballers
People from Usk
Sportspeople from Monmouthshire
Association football central defenders
Hereford United F.C. players
Cheltenham Town F.C. players
English Football League players
Southern Football League players